Beverly Peele (born March 18, 1975) is an American model and actress. Peele rose to fame in the late 1980s and 1990s, as a supermodel, working with Naomi Campbell, Cindy Crawford and many others, appearing mostly in Mademoiselle and Elle magazine.  She appeared on over 250 fashion magazine covers including Vogue and Harpers Bazar.

Career
Born in Los Angeles, California, Peele began modeling in 1987 at age 12 and landed her first magazine cover, Mademoiselle, in 1989. During her modeling career, she was featured in ads for the likes of Ralph Lauren, Donna Karan, Versace, among others. She also did runway work for Chanel and Comme des Garçons. Peele has appeared on magazine covers worldwide including Vogue, Mademoiselle, Elle, and Cosmopolitan.

In addition to modeling, Peele also appeared in Heavy D & the Boyz's music video for "Nuttin' but Love," Jodeci's 1995 video "Freakin You", and George Michael's Thierry Mugler-styled "Too Funky" video alongside Nadja Auermann, Tyra Banks, Linda Evangelista, Estelle Hallyday, and Rossy de Palma. In 1997, she began acting and appeared in Sister, Sister [Season 5, Episode 1: Designer Genes] and Girlfriends. Peele also had a role in the 2002 film Sweet Friggin' Daisies with Zooey Deschanel.

Personal life 
In 1993, at age 17, Peele had a daughter named Cairo with former partner Jeffrey Alexander. She has since welcomed two sons, Trey and DJ, and a daughter, Storm (b. 2017). Cairo, DJ, and Storm appeared with Peele on the Lifetime docuseries Growing Up Supermodel.

On May 10, 2010, Peele and her daughter Cairo were in a car accident which resulted in multiple broken bones and internal injuries.

In 2021, Peele alleged that Peter Nygård was the father of her son Trey, who she said was conceived after Nygård sexually assaulted her sometime in the 1990s. An attorney for Nygård denied the allegation.

References

External links

African-American actresses
African-American female models
American female models
African-American models
American film actresses
American television actresses
1975 births
Living people
21st-century African-American people
21st-century African-American women
20th-century African-American people
20th-century African-American women